Sinda may refer to:

 Sinda (Pamphylia), an ancient city, former bishopric and Roman Catholic titular see in Asian Turkey
 Sinda (Pisidia), an ancient town of Anatolia
 Sinda, Tibet, China
 Sinda District, Zambia
 Inner Sinda and Outer Sinda, two of the nine islands of the Dar es Salaam Marine Reserve in Tanzania
 Sinta, Cyprus
 Anapa, Russia, known as Sinda in antiquity

SINDA may refer to:
 Singapore Indian Development Association (SINDA) 
 Systems Improved Numerical Differential Analyzer (SINDA), software to calculate thermal behaviour of spacecraft